is a Japanese national volleyball player from Ebetsu, Hokkaido. He plays in V.League division 1 for Osaka Blazers Sakai.

Clubs 
  Towa no Mori Sanai High School 
  Nippon Sport Science University
  FC Tokyo (2017–2018)
  Osaka Blazers Sakai (2018–present)

Awards

Individual
 2019 Asian Men's Volleyball Championship — Best Libero

References

1994 births
Living people
People from Ebetsu, Hokkaido
Japanese men's volleyball players
Sportspeople from Hokkaido
Medalists at the 2017 Summer Universiade
Volleyball players at the 2020 Summer Olympics
Olympic volleyball players of Japan
Liberos
21st-century Japanese people